Brandon Comley (born 18 November 1995) is a professional footballer who plays for EFL League Two side Walsall. Born in England, he represents the Montserrat national team. 

Comley came through the Queens Park Rangers Academy, joining at the age of nine and made his first-team debut in 2015 in the Premier League. He had loan spells in League Two with Carlisle United, Grimsby Town, and Colchester United. He joined the latter on a permanent basis in January 2018.

Club career

Queens Park Rangers
Born in Islington, London, Comley joined Queens Park Rangers Academy at the age of nine, where he progressed through the age groups to eventually make his first-team debut in 2015. He made his club and Premier League debut on 24 May 2015 as an 80th-minute substitute for Karl Henry during QPR's 5–1 defeat at Leicester City on the final day of the season.

After facing Carlisle United in the League Cup first round on 25 August 2015, Comley made a loan move to the League Two club on 21 January 2016 in an initial month-long deal. He made his United debut ten days later, starting in their 3–0 home defeat by Everton in the fourth round of the FA Cup. In just his third appearance for the club, Comley was sent off for a second bookable offence during Carlisle's 1–0 league defeat to Newport County on 13 February. His loan was extended until the end of the season in March 2016. He went on to make 13 appearances for the Cumbrians.

On 31 August 2016, Comley signed for League Two side Grimsby Town on loan until January 2017. He made his debut on 3 September during Grimsby's 2–2 draw at Notts County. He made 22 appearances for Grimsby in all competitions before he returned to QPR in January. He made one appearance for his parent club, before rejoining Grimsby on loan until the end of the season. He made a further 13 league appearances for the club.

On 31 August 2017, Comley joined League Two club Colchester United on loan until January 2018. He made his Colchester debut on 9 September in their 3–1 win against Crawley Town. At the completion of his loan, he had made 23 first-team appearances for the U's.

Colchester United
Colchester United signed their former loanee Comley on a permanent basis on 17 January 2018 for an undisclosed fee. He joined on a -year contract. He made his second debut for the club on 27 January 2018 as a substitute for Courtney Senior in Colchester's 2–2 draw at Port Vale. He scored his first professional goal on 10 March in a 1–1 draw at Mansfield Town. On 28 April 2020 Colchester confirmed that Comley would be released at the end his contract in June 2020.

Bolton Wanderers

On 21 July 2020, Comley joined Bolton Wanderers on a two-year deal. His debut came on 5 September in Bolton's first match of the season, a 1–2 home defeat against Bradford in the first round of the EFL Cup. He wasn't included in Bolton's squad list for the 21/22 season, meaning he would be unable to play in any league matches. On 3 November 2021 the club confirmed that Comley had had his contract terminated by mutual consent.

Dagenham & Redbridge
On 5 February 2022, he dropped into non-league when he signed for National League side Dagenham & Redbridge on a deal until the end of the season.

Walsall
On 20 June 2022, Comley agreed to join League Two club Walsall on a two-year deal from 1 July 2022.

International career
In March 2015, Comley was called up by the Montserrat national team to represent them in two 2018 FIFA World Cup qualifying first round fixtures against Curaçao. He did not appear in either fixture.

In August 2018, Comley was again called up by Montserrat ahead of their CONCACAF Nations League qualifier against El Salvador on 8 September. He played the full 90 minutes as Montserrat fell to a 2–1 defeat to the Central American nation.

Personal life
Brandon has an older brother James who is also a footballer. He played alongside James on his international debut against El Salvador in September 2018.

Career statistics

Club

International

Honours
Bolton Wanderers
EFL League Two third-place (promotion): 2020–21

References

External links
Brandon Comley profile at the Colchester United F.C. website

1995 births
Living people
Footballers from Islington (district)
Montserrat international footballers
English footballers
English people of Montserratian descent
Black British sportsmen
Association football midfielders
Queens Park Rangers F.C. players
Carlisle United F.C. players
Grimsby Town F.C. players
Colchester United F.C. players
Bolton Wanderers F.C. players 
Dagenham & Redbridge F.C. players
Walsall F.C. players
Premier League players
English Football League players
National League (English football) players
Montserratian footballers